Oshawa Central GO Station is a planned GO Transit train station to be built by Metrolinx in Oshawa, Ontario, Canada as part of the approved expansion of train service on the Lakeshore East line to Bowmanville. It will be built along an existing freight rail line owned by Canadian Pacific Railway, on a section of land formerly occupied by Ontario Malleable Iron Company until 1977 and later by Knob Hill Farms (1980 to 2000) at 500 Howard Street in downtown Oshawa.

, Metrolinx identifies this station by the name "Ritson Road" rather than "Oshawa Central" on its website; station names are still subject to change.

Description
GO Transit plans to abandon service at its existing Oshawa GO Station once the expansion is completed and, together with nearby Thornton's Corners GO Station, this station will provide service for Oshawa. Approximately 1,228 parking spaces will be supplied on opening day, and future parking expansions will be possible. Bike shelters, a bus loop and a “Kiss and Ride” area will be included. GO Transit plans to work with the City of Oshawa and preserve older façade sections of a building on the station site.

History
By 2011, Metrolinx was planning to convert a building that used to be a Knob Hill Farms grocery store into a GO train station located near Simcoe Street, but the plans to build a station there were scrapped due to environmental concerns and the challenge of reaching a fair purchase price with the property owner. 
However, Metrolinx was ready to restart negotiations if both sides could come to an agreement on a fair purchase price for the building. 
Nonetheless, Metrolinx expropriated the site at 500 Howard Street and took possession of it on July 25, 2014 even though the purchase price had not been settled at that time.

References

External links
 GO Transit - Environmental Assessments

Future GO Transit railway stations
Railway stations in Oshawa
Proposed railway stations in Canada